The California Air Resources Board (CARB or ARB) is the "clean air agency" of the government of California. Established in 1967 when then-governor Ronald Reagan signed the Mulford-Carrell Act, combining the Bureau of Air Sanitation and the Motor Vehicle Pollution Control Board, CARB is a department within the cabinet-level California Environmental Protection Agency.

The stated goals of CARB include attaining and maintaining healthy air quality; protecting the public from exposure to toxic air contaminants; and providing innovative approaches for complying with air pollution rules and regulations. CARB has also been instrumental in driving innovation throughout the global automotive industry through programs such as its ZEV mandate.

One of CARB's responsibilities is to define vehicle emissions standards. California is the only state permitted to issue emissions standards under the federal Clean Air Act, subject to a waiver from the United States Environmental Protection Agency. Other states may choose to follow CARB or the federal vehicle emission standards but may not set their own.

Governance

CARB's governing board is made up of 16 members, with 2 non-voting members appointed for legislative oversight, one each by the California State Assembly and Senate. 12 of the 14 voting members are appointed by the governor and subject to confirmation by the Senate: five from local air districts, four air pollution subject-matter experts, two members of the public, and the Chair. The other two voting members are appointed from environmental justice committees by the Assembly and Senate.

Five of the governor-appointed board members are chosen from regional air pollution control or air quality management districts, including one each from:

 Bay Area AQMD (San Francisco Bay Area), currently John Gioia
 San Diego County APCD, currently Nathan Fletcher
 San Joaquin Valley APCD, currently Alexander Sherriffs, M.D. 
 South Coast AQMD, currently Judy Mitchell 
 A Sacramento-area district: Sacramento Metropolitan AQMD, Yolo-Solano AQMD, Placer County APCD, Feather River AQMD, or El Dorado County AQMD, currently Phil Serna

Four governor-appointed board members are subject matter experts in specific fields: automotive engineering, currently Dan Sperling; science, agriculture, or law, currently John Eisenhut; medicine, currently John R. Balmes, M.D.; and air pollution control. The governor is also responsible for two appointees from members of the public, and the final governor appointee is the Board's Chair. The first Chair of CARB was Dr. Arie Jan Haagen-Smit, who was previously a professor at the California Institute of Technology and started research into air pollution in 1948. Dr. Haagen-Smit is credited with discovering the source of smog in California, which led to the development of air pollution controls and standards.

The two legislature-appointed board members work directly with communities affected by air pollution. They are currently Diane Takvorian and Dean Florez, appointed by the Assembly and Senate respectively.

Organizational structure
CARB is a part of the California Environmental Protection Agency, an organization which reports directly to the Governor's Office in the Executive Branch of California State Government.

CARB has 15 divisions and offices:

Office of the Chair
Executive Office
Office of Community Air Protection
Air Quality Planning and Science Division
Emission Certification and Compliance Division
Enforcement Division
Industrial Strategies Division
Mobile Source Control Division
Mobile Source Laboratory Division
Research Division
Sustainable Transportation and Communities Division
Transportation and Toxics Division
Office of Information Services
Administrative Services Division

Air Quality Planning and Science Division

The division assesses the extent of California's air quality problems and the progress being made to abate them, coordinates statewide development of clean air plans and maintains databases pertinent to air quality and emissions. The division's technical support work provides a basis for clean air plans and CARB's regulatory programs. This support includes management and interpretation of emission inventories, air quality data, meteorological data and of air quality modeling.

The Air Quality Planning and Science Division has five branches:

Special Assessment Branch
Emission Inventory and Economic Analysis Branch
Modeling & Meteorology Branch
Air Quality Planning Branch
Mobile Source Analysis Branch
Consumer Products and Air Quality Assessment Branch

Atmospheric Modeling & Support Section
The Atmospheric Modeling & Support Section is one of three sections within the Modeling & Meteorology Branch. The other two sections are the Regional Air Quality Modeling Section and the Meteorology Section.

The air quality and atmospheric pollution dispersion models routinely used by this Section include a number of the models recommended by the U.S. Environmental Protection Agency (EPA). The section uses models which were either developed by CARB or whose development was funded by CARB, such as:

 CALPUFFOriginally developed by the Sigma Research Company (SRC) under contract to CARB. Currently maintained by the TRC Solution Company under contract to the U.S. EPA.
 CALGRIDDeveloped by CARB and currently maintained by CARB.
 SARMAPDeveloped by CARB and currently maintained by CARB.

Role in reducing greenhouse gases

The California Air Resources Board is charged with implementing California's comprehensive suite of policies to reduce emissions of greenhouse gases. In part due to the efforts of CARB,  California has successfully decoupled greenhouse gas emissions from economic growth, and achieved its goal of reducing emissions to 1990 levels four years earlier than the target date of 2020.

Alternative Fuel Vehicle Incentive Program
Alternative Fuel Vehicle Incentive Program (also known as Fueling Alternatives) is funded by the California Air Resources Board (CARB), offered throughout the State of California and administered by the California Center for Sustainable Energy (CCSE).

Low-Emission Vehicle Program

The CARB first adopted the Low-Emission Vehicle (LEV) Program standards in 1990 to address smog-forming pollutants, which covered automobiles sold in California from 1994 through 2003. An amendment to the LEV Program, known as LEV II, was adopted in 1999, and covered vehicles for the 2004 through 2014 model years. Greenhouse gas (GHG) emission regulations were adopted in 2004 starting for the 2009 model year, and are named the "Pavley" standards after Assemblymember Fran Pavley, who had written Assembly Bill 1493 in 2002 to establish them. A second amendment, LEV III, was adopted in 2012, and covers vehicles sold from 2015 onward for both smog (superseding LEV II) and GHG (superseding Pavley) emissions. The rules created under the LEV Program have been codified as specific sections in Title 13 of the California Code of Regulations; in general, LEV I is § 1960.1; LEV II is § 1961; Pavley is § 1961.1; LEV III is § 1961.2 (smog-forming pollutants) and 1961.3 (GHG). The ZEV regulations, which were initially part of LEV I, have been broken out separately into § 1962.

Required labeling

The Federal Government followed suit and required a similar "smog score" on new vehicles sold starting in 2013; the standards were realigned for labels applied to 2018 model year vehicles.

Vehicle categories
The LEV program has established several categories of reduced emissions vehicles. LEV I defined LEV and ULEV vehicles, and added TLEV and Tier 1 temporary classifications that would not be sold after 2003. LEV II added SULEV and PZEV vehicles, and LEV III tightened emission standards. The actual emission levels depend on the standards in use.
 LEV (Low Emission Vehicle): The least stringent emission standard for all new cars sold in California beyond 2004.
 ULEV (Ultra Low Emission Vehicle): 50% cleaner than the average new 2003 model year vehicle.
 SULEV (Super Ultra Low Emission Vehicle): These vehicles emit substantially lower levels of hydrocarbons, carbon monoxide, oxides of nitrogen and particulate matter than conventional vehicles. They are 90% cleaner than the average new 2003 model year vehicle.

LEV I defined emission limits for several different classes of vehicle, including passenger cars (PC), light-duty trucks (LDT), and medium-duty vehicles (MDV). In addition, LEV I had defined less stringent limits for heavier LDTs (denoted LDT2 with a LVW ); LEV II closed that discrepancy and defined a single emissions standard for all PCs and LDTs. Under LEV III, medium-duty passenger vehicles (MDPV) were brought under the most stringent standards alongside PCs and LDTs.

Smog-forming compound emissions limits
Rather than providing a single standard for vehicles based on age, purpose, and weight, the LEV I standards introduced different tiers of limits for smog-forming compound emissions starting in the 1995 model year. After 2003, LEV was the minimum standard to be met.

Greenhouse gas emissions limits

CARB adopted regulations for limits on greenhouse gas emissions in 2004 starting with the 2009 model year to support the direction provided by AB 1493. In June 2005, Governor Arnold Schwarzenegger signed Executive Order S-03-05, which required a reduction in California GHG emissions, targeting an 80% reduction compared to 1990 levels by 2050. Assembly Bill 32, better known as the California Global Warming Solutions Act of 2006, codified these requirements.

CARB filed a waiver request with the United States Environmental Protection Agency (EPA) under Section 209(b) of the Clean Air Act in December 2005 to permit it to establish limits on greenhouse gas emissions; although the waiver request was initially denied in March 2008, it was later approved on June 30, 2009 after President Barack Obama signed a Presidential Memorandum directing the EPA to reconsider the waiver. In the initial denial, EPA Administrator Stephen L. Johnson stated the Clean Air Act was not "intended to allow California to promulgate state standards for emissions from new motor vehicles designed to address global climate change problems" and further, that he did not believe "the effects of climate change in California are compelling and extraordinary compared to the effects in the rest of the country." Johnson's successor, Lisa P. Jackson, signed the waiver overturning Johnson's denial, writing that "EPA must grant California a waiver if California determines that its standards are, in the aggregate, at least as protective of the public health and welfare as applicable Federal standards." Jackson also noted that in the history of the waiver process, over 50 waivers had been granted and only one had been fully denied, namely the March 2008 denial of the GHG emissions regulation.

CARB decided to adopt regulation of GHG emissions under Executive Order G-05-061, which provided phase-in targets for fleet average GHG emissions in -equivalent grams per mile starting with the 2009 model year.

The emissions in g/mi -equivalent are calculated according to the formula , which has two terms for direct and indirect emissions allowances of air conditioning refrigerants, depending on the refrigerant used, such as HFC134a, and the system design. Vehicles powered by alternative fuels use a slightly modified formula, where  is a fuel adjustment factor depending on the alternative fuel used (1.03 for natural gas, 0.89 for LPG, and 0.74 for E85). ZEVs are also required to calculate GHG as the processes to generate the energy (or fuel) used also produce GHG. For ZEVs, where  is the upstream emissions factor (130 g/mi for battery electric vehicles, 210 for hydrogen/fuel cell, and 290 for hydrogen/internal combustion). Direct  emissions could be calculated in a relatively straightforward fashion based on fuel consumption. Manufacturers that do not wish to measure  emissions may assume a value of 0.006 g/mi. An update was issued in 2010 which allowed manufacturers to calculate GHG emissions using CAFE data; for conventionally powered vehicles, the contribution from the nitrous oxide and methane terms could be assumed to be 1.9 g/mi.

CARB voted unanimously in March 2017 to require automakers to average  for new cars in 2025.

Section 177 states

Because California had emissions regulations prior to the 1977 Clean Air Act, under Section 177 of that bill, other states may adopt the more stringent California emissions regulations as an alternative to federal standards. Thirteen other states and the District of Columbia have chosen to do so, and ten of those have additionally adopted the California Zero-Emission Vehicle regulations. In December 2020, Minnesota announced its intention to adopt California LEV and ZEV rules; following a hearing before an administrative law judge in February 2021, the Minnesota Pollution Control Agency adopted the California regulations. In August 2022, Virginia, citing to a 2021 law, announced it would follow California regulations for ZEV registrations.

Arizona and New Mexico had previously adopted California LEV regulations under Section 177, but later repealed those states' clean car standards in 2012 and 2013, respectively.

In Canada, the province of Quebec adopted CARB standards effective in 2010. CARB and the Government of Canada entered into a Memorandum of Understanding in June 2019 to cooperate on greenhouse gas emissions mitigation.

Zero-Emission Vehicle Program
The CARB Zero-Emission Vehicle (ZEV) program was enacted by the California government starting in 1990 to promote the use of zero emission vehicles. The program goal is to reduce the pervasive air pollution affecting the main metropolitan areas in the state, particularly in Los Angeles, where prolonged pollution episodes are frequent. The California ZEV rule was first adopted by CARB as part of the 1990 Low-Emission Vehicle (LEV I) Program. The focus of the 1990 rules (ZEV-90) was to meet air quality standards for ozone rather than the reduction of greenhouse gas (GHG) emissions.

Under LEV II in 1999, the ZEV regulations were moved to a separate section (13 CCR § 1962) and the requirements for ZEVs as a percentage of fleet sales was made more formal. Executive Order S-03-05 (2005) and Assembly Bills 1493 (2002) and 32 (2006) prompted CARB to reevaluate the ZEV program as last amended in 1996, which had been primarily concerned with reducing emissions of smog-forming pollutants. By the time AB 32 passed in 2006, vehicles complying with PZEV and AT PZEV standards had become commercially successful, and the ZEV program could then shift towards reducing both smog-forming compounds and greenhouse gases.

The next set of ZEV regulations were adopted in 2012 with LEV III. CARB put both LEV and ZEV rules together as the Advanced Clean Cars Program (ACC), adopted in 2012, which included regulations for cars sold through the 2025 model year. The regulations include updates to regulations for LEV III (for smog-forming emissions), LEV III GHG (for greenhouse gas emissions), and ZEV. Since then, in September 2020 Governor Gavin Newsom signed an executive order directing that by 2035, all new cars and passenger trucks sold in California  will be zero-emission vehicles. Executive Order N-79-20 directs CARB to develop regulations to require that ZEVs be an increasing share of new vehicles sold in the state, with light-duty cars and trucks and off-road vehicles and equipment meeting the 100% ZEV goal by 2035 and medium and heavy-duty trucks and buses meeting the same 100% ZEV goal by 2045. The order also directs Caltrans to develop near-term actions to encourage "an integrated, statewide rail and transit network" and infrastructure to support bicycles and pedestrians. In response, CARB began development of the Advanced Clean Cars II (ACC II) Program, focusing on emissions of vehicles sold after 2025. ACC II is scheduled for consideration before CARB in June 2022.

Vehicle definitions
LEV I defined a ZEV as one that produces "zero emissions of any criteria pollutants under any and all possible operational modes and conditions." A vehicle could still qualify as a ZEV with a fuel-fired heater, as long as the heater was unable to be operated at ambient temperatures above  and did not have any evaporative emissions. Under LEV II (ZEV-99), the ZEV definition was updated to include precursor pollutants, but did not consider upstream emissions from power plants.

The ZEV regulation has evolved and been modified several times since 1990, and several new partial or low-emission categories were created and defined, including the introduction of PZEV and AT PZEV categories in ZEV-99.

 PZEV (Partial Zero Emission Vehicle): Meets SULEV tailpipe standards, has a 15-year / 150,000 mile warranty, and zero evaporative emissions. These vehicles are 80% cleaner than the average 2002 model year car.
 AT PZEV (Advanced Technology PZEV): These are advanced technology vehicles that meet PZEV standards and include ZEV enabling technology, typically hybrid electric vehicles (HEV). They are 80% cleaner than the average 2002 model year car.
 ZEV (Zero Emission Vehicle): Zero tailpipe emissions, and 98% cleaner than the average new 2003 model year vehicle.

Manufacturer sales volume
Under ZEV-90, CARB classified manufacturers according to the average sales per year between 1989 and 1993; small volume manufacturers were those that sold 3,000 or fewer new vehicles per year; intermediate volume manufacturers sold between 3,001 and 35,000; and large volume manufacturers sold more than 35,000 per year. For large volume manufacturers, CARB required that 2% of 1998 to 2000 model year vehicles sold were ZEVs, ramping up to 5% ZEVs by 2001 and 10% ZEVs in 2003 and beyond. Intermediate volume manufacturers were not required to meet the goals until 2003, and small volume manufacturers were exempted.

ZEV credit system

The LEV I rules also introduced the concept of emission credits. Under LEV I, the vehicle fleet average emissions rate of non-methane organic gases (NMOG) produced by a manufacturer was required to meet increasingly stringent requirements starting in 1994. The calculation of fleet average NMOG emissions was based on a weighted sum of vehicle NMOG emissions, based on the number sold and type of certification (i.e., TLEV, LEV, ULEV, etc.), divided by the total number of vehicles produced, including ZEVs. Manufacturers whose fleet average NMOG emissions met or exceeded the NMOG emissions goal would be subjected to civil penalties; those which fell below the goal would receive credits, which could then be marketed to other manufacturers. 

The 1996 amendments to the ZEV regulations in LEV I (ZEV-96) introduced credits where a ZEV could be counted more than once based on vehicle range or battery specific energy to encourage deployment of ZEVs prior to 2003.

Under LEV II/ZEV-99, the PZEV and AT PZEV categories were introduced, and the percentage of ZEVs sold by a manufacturer could be partially met by the sales of PZEV and AT PZEVs. If a vehicle met PZEV criteria, it qualified for a credit equal to 0.2 of one ZEV for the purposes of calculating that manufacturer's ZEV production. AT PZEVs capable of traveling with zero emissions for a limited range were allowed additional credit if the urban all-electric range was at least ten miles. ZEVs that were introduced prior to 2003 received a multiplier, with a value ranging up to 10× a single ZEV depending on the all-electric range and fast-charging capability.

MOA demonstration fleet

In March 1996, ZEV-96 eliminated the ZEV ramp-up planned to start in 1998, but the goal of 10% ZEVs by 2003 was retained, with credits granted for sales of partial ZEVs (PZEVs). According to comment responses, CARB determined that advanced batteries would not be ready in time to meet the ZEV requirements until at least 2003.

In conjunction with relaxing the requirements in ZEV-96, CARB signed memoranda of agreement (MOAs) with the seven large scale manufacturers to begin rolling out demonstration fleets of ZEVs with limited public availability in the near term. The GM EV1 was the first battery electric vehicle (BEV) offered to the public, in partial fulfillment of the agreement with CARB. The EV1 was available only through a /month lease  starting in December 1996; the initial markets were South Coast, San Diego, and Arizona, and expanded to Sacramento and the Bay Area. GM also offered an electric S-10 pickup truck to fleet operators.

In 1997, Honda (EV Plus, May 1997), Toyota (RAV4 EV, October 1997), and Chrysler (EPIC, 1997) followed suit. Ford also introduced the Ranger EV for the 1998 model year, and Nissan stated they planned to offer the Altra in the 1998 model year as well to fulfill the MOA. As an acceptable alternative, Mazda stated they would purchase ZEV credits from Ford.

Advanced Clean Cars
The Low-Emission Vehicle Program was revised to define modified ZEV regulations for 2015 models. CARB estimates that ACC will result in 10% of all sales to be ZEVs by 2025. The share remained at 3% between 2014 and 2016. Battery vehicles receive 3 or 4 credits, while fuel cell cars receive 9. , a credit has a market value of $3-4,000, and some automakers have more credits than required.

CARB held a public workshop in September 2020 where several new consumer-friendly regulations for ZEVs were proposed to improve adoption:
 Standardization of a DC Fast Charge inlet (proposing to use CCS Combo 1, with adapters provided by the vehicle manufacturer if applicable)
 Standardization of vehicle and battery data (to assist assessment of need for repairs/condition)
 Implement a standardized battery state-of-health (SOH) indicator (using SAE J1634 dynamometer testing to define battery capacity) and define a value of battery SOH that qualifies for warranty repair
 Make ZEV powertrain service and repair information available to independent technicians and repair shops (including standardization of communication protocols for vehicle data)
In May 2021, additional draft requirements were added:
 Durability: BEVs to maintain 80% of certified range for 15 years/150,000 miles
 Durability: FCEVs to maintain 90% of fuel cell system output power after 4,000 hours of operation
 Battery Labelling: standardized content to improve the efficiency of recycling batteries to recover materials or potential repurposing
To improve access to ZEVs, CARB added proposed environmental justice (EJ) credits in August 2021 for manufacturers who improve options for clean transportation to underserved communities, such as by providing a discount on a ZEV that would be used in a community-based clean mobility program. The August workshop also included additional regulations for ZEVs:
 Range: starting in 2026, minimum (2-cycle) range to be 
 On-board charger: minimum 5.76 kW for AC (Level 2) charging, sufficient for a BEV to charge overnight (8 hours) from a 30A source

The final workshop in October 2021 proposed that ZEVs would be taken out of fleet calculations for vehicle emissions and provided yearly targets for ZEV vehicle sales as a percent of total sales, including potential EJ credits. Additionally, the required warranty period and requirements to take credit for PHEV sales were defined:
 Battery to retain ≥ 80% SoH for 8 years/100,000 miles
 PHEVs to meet one of two requirements:
 Transitional PHEVs (2026–28): minimum  all-electric range with additional credit if vehicle exceeds  on the US06 high speed/acceleration cycle; 8 year/100,000 80%SOH battery warranty, 5.76 kW on-board charger
 Full credit PHEVs (2026+): minimum  all-electric range, minimum  on the US06 high speed/acceleration cycle; 8 year/100,000 80%SOH battery warranty, 5.76 kW on-board charger
 "Small volume" manufacturers (defined as those selling fewer than 4,500 cars per year) are required to comply with the ZEV mandate starting with the 2035 model year

Hybrid and Zero-Emission Truck and Bus Voucher Incentive Project

California Hybrid and Zero-Emission Truck and Bus Voucher Incentive Project (HVIP for short) offers up-front discounts on medium and heavy duty electric trucks.  Additionally, discounts will be increased for public transit agencies, school buses for public school districts, and vehicles operating in disadvantaged communities. For example, a public school district could receive up to $198,000 off the price of a new electric bus; a public transit agency could receive $69,000 off the price of a new Class 4 electric shuttle. Launched by the California Air Resources Board in 2009, the project is part of California Climate Investments.

OHV Emission Standards 

The California DMV implements the policy dictates of the California Air Resources Board (CARB) with respect to registration of off-highway motor vehicles (OHVs). Registration consists of ID plates or placards issued by the DMV. Operating a motorized vehicle off-highway in California requires either a Green Sticker or a Red Sticker ID. The Green Sticker indicates that the vehicle has passed emission requirements.  The Red Sticker (issued through 2021) restricts OHV use due to not meeting emission standards established by the CARB. The red sticker program began in 1994 when CARB adopted standards for emissions from two-stroke engines used primarily on dirt bikes. Between 1998 and 2003 the red sticker program was refined allowing vehicles that did not meet peak ozone season standards to be operated only at specific times of the year.  As of model year 2022 the CARB no longer authorizes issuing of red stickers.

Low-carbon fuel standard

The Low-Carbon Fuel Standard (LCFS) requires oil refineries and distributors to ensure that the mix of fuel they sell in the Californian market meets the established declining targets for greenhouse gas emissions measured in CO2-equivalent grams per unit of fuel energy sold for transport purposes. The 2007 Governor's LCFS directive calls for a reduction of at least 10% in the carbon intensity of California's transportation fuels by 2020. These reductions include not only tailpipe emissions but also all other associated emissions from production, distribution and use of transport fuels within the state. Therefore, California LCFS considers the fuel's full life cycle, also known as the "well to wheels" or "seed to wheels" efficiency of transport fuels. The standard is aimed to reduce the state’s dependence on petroleum, create a market for clean transportation technology, and stimulate the production and use of alternative, low-carbon fuels in California.

On April 23, 2009, CARB approved the specific rules for the LCFS that will go into effect in January 2011. The rule proposal prepared by its technical staff was approved by a 9-1 vote, to set the 2020 maximum carbon intensity reference value to 86 grams of carbon dioxide released per megajoule of energy produced.

PHEV Research Center

The PHEV Research Center was launched with funding from the California Air Resources Board.

Innovative Clean Transit

Under the Innovative Clean Transit (formerly known as the Advanced Clean Transit) regulation adopted in December 2018, public transportation agencies in California will gradually transition to a zero-emission bus fleet by 2040. Large transit agencies (defined as those operating more than 65 buses in the San Joaquin Valley Air Basin or South Coast Air Quality Management District, or those operating more than 100 buses elsewhere with populations greater than 200,000) are required to have 25% of new bus purchases as zero-emission buses (ZEBs) starting in 2023, 50% of new purchases as ZEBs starting in 2026, and 100% of new purchases as ZEBs starting in 2029. Small transit agencies are required to make 25% of new purchases as ZEBs in 2026 and 100% of new purchases as ZEBs in 2029+. Per the regulation, ZEBs are defined to include battery electric buses and fuel cell buses, but do not include electric trolleybuses which draw power from overhead lines. The Antelope Valley Transit Authority has set a goal to be the first all-electric fleet by the end of 2018, ahead of the tightened regulations.

Regulation of ozone produced by air cleaners and ionizers 

The California Air Resources Board has a page listing air cleaners (many with ionizers) meeting their indoor ozone limit of 0.050 parts per million. From that article:

Southern California headquarters, Mary D. Nichols Campus 

On October 27, 2017 CARB broke ground on its new state-of-the-art Southern California headquarters. CARB chose the site near the University of California, Riverside, in March 2016 and completed environmental studies in June 2017. Construction costs of $419 million, which include $108 million for specialized laboratory and testing equipment, were approved by the Legislature in July. Of those costs, $154 million comes from fines paid by Volkswagen for air quality violations related to the diesel car cheating case. Additional funds will come from the Motor Vehicle Account, the Air Pollution Control Fund and the Vehicle Inspection Repair Fund.

Over a decade of planning has gone into the development of a replacement for CARB’s aging Haagen-Smit Laboratory. Opened in 1973 in El Monte, California, the Haagen-Smit Laboratory is the site of many of CARB’s groundbreaking efforts to reduce the emissions of cars and trucks, as well as efforts to introduce zero-emission and plug-in vehicles to California. In 2015, engineers and technicians based at the Haagen-Smit Laboratory were instrumental in discovering the infamous VW diesel “defeat device,” leading to the largest emissions control violation settlement in national and California history.

The new campus features an extended range of dedicated test cells, including heavy-duty testing. There is also workspace for accommodating new test methods for future generations of vehicles, and space for developing enhanced on-board diagnostics and portable emissions measurement systems. The facility also includes a separate advanced chemistry laboratory. The Southern California Headquarters’ office and administration space accommodates 460 employees and includes visitor reception and public areas, a press room, flexible conference and workshop space, and a 250-person public auditorium.

Sustainability drove the striking architecture and every detail of the campus. Designed by ZGF Architects and built by Hensel Phelps, the new headquarters is built for the future. At 402,000 square feet, it is designed to be the largest Zero Net Energy building in the United States, aided by solar arrays throughout the campus that generate 3.5 Megawatts of electricity, and a chilled beam temperature management system that provides increased energy efficiency and occupant comfort. As a result, the facility achieves Leadership in Energy and Environmental Design (LEED) Platinum certification, and California Green Building Standards Code (CALGreen) Tier 2 standards and is designed to achieve Zero-Net Energy performance .

On November 18, 2021, CARB dedicated the new Southern California headquarters in honor of former Chair Mary D. Nichols whose career at CARB spanned four decades under three different California governors.

See also

California Air Resources Board
 List of California Air Districts
 2008 California Statewide Truck and Bus Rule
 Carl Moyer Memorial Air Quality Standards Attainment Program
Other

 Bioenergy Action Plan
 California Center for Sustainable Energy
 California Code of Regulations
 California Energy Commission
 California Environmental Protection Agency
 California Public Utilities Commission
 Carl Moyer Program
 Ecology of California
 Emission standards
 Emissions trading
 Greenhouse gas emissions by the United States
 Million Solar Roofs (SB 1)
 Plug-in hybrids in California
 Pollution in California
 Regional Greenhouse Gas Initiative
 Spare the Air program
 Texas Low Emission Diesel standards
 Timeline of major US environmental and occupational health regulation
 Upstream emission factor
 US Emission standard
 Vehicle acronyms and abbreviations
 Who Killed the Electric Car?
 Zero-emissions vehicle

References

External links
 
 Title 13 Motor Vehicles, Division 3 regulations in the California Code of Regulations (CCR) from Westlaw
 Title 17 Public Health, Division 3 regulations in the CCR from Westlaw
 CARB's Low-Emission Vehicle Regulations and Test Procedures
 CARB web site page on Climate Change
  CARB's Diesel Emission Control Strategies Verification

News
 California charts course to fight global warming: California's greenhouse gas emissions by 30 percent over the next 12 years.
 California air board announces plan for carbon-credit trading.

Air
Air pollution in California
Air pollution organizations
Air Resources Board
Environment of California
Government agencies established in 1967
1967 establishments in California
Sustainable transport